John Schoff Millis  (November 22, 1903 – January 1, 1988) was the tenth and last President of Western Reserve College, now Case Western Reserve University.

Millis was born in Palo Alto, California on November 22, 1903. He entered the University of Chicago at the age of 16, earning undergraduate degrees in mathematics and astronomy in 1924. He then received a master's degree in physics in 1927 and a doctoral degree in physics in 1931, studying under physicist Albert A. Michelson. On June 13, 1929, Millis married Katherine Roseberry Wisner of Baltimore, MD, and together they had three children.

Millis served as dean of Lawrence College in Wisconsin from 1936 to 1941. Millis served as president of the University of Vermont from 1941 to 1949. For the majority of his career, Millis held the position of president of Western Reserve University from 1947 under the federation with Case Institute of Technology in 1967. He served as Chancellor of the new Case Western Reserve University, where he retired on June 30, 1969. While in Cleveland, Millis helped organize the University Circle Development Foundation, predecessor to University Circle Incorporated (UCI). Millis died of cancer at his home in Cleveland Heights, Ohio, on January 1, 1988.

References

External links
 Case Western Reserve bio

1903 births
1988 deaths
People from Palo Alto, California
University of Chicago alumni
Case Western Reserve University faculty
Presidents of the University of Vermont
Lawrence University faculty
Presidents of Case Western Reserve University
Members of the National Academy of Medicine
20th-century American academics